This is a list of groups of siblings who achieved notability together, whether in music, arts or other spheres of life.

Sibling musical groups
Some of these groups comprise only siblings; others were formed of siblings and their friends.

2:54, alternative rock band, consisting of sisters Colette and Hannah Thurlow
2 Brothers on the 4th Floor, a Dutch eurodance band with Martin and Bobby Boer
30 Seconds to Mars, an American rock band, Jared and Shannon Leto
The 4 of Us, a rock band from Newry, County Down, Northern Ireland, best known outside Ireland for their output in the late 1980s and early 1990s
4 P.M. (For Positive Music), an American male R&B group best known for their cover version of "Sukiyaki" 
4th Impact, a Filipina pop group consisting of sisters Almira, Irene, Celina and Mylene Cercado
The "5" Royales, an American R&B vocal group that combined gospel, jump blues and doo-wop, marking an early and influential step in the evolution of rock and roll
77 Bombay Street, a Swiss folk rock musical group, which consists of four brothers Matt, Joe, Simri-Ramon and Esra Buchli
702, an American vocal girl group, with the final and most known line up consisting of Kameelah Williams and sisters Irish and LeMisha Grinstead
98 Degrees, an American pop and R&B vocal group whose founding member include brothers Nick and Drew Lachey
? and the Mysterians, American garage rock band from  Saginaw, Michigan Robert and Rudy Martinez aka ?
A, an English rock band, Giles Perry and identical twins Jason and Adam Perry
Abjeez, a Persian Alternative band, Safoura and Melody Safavi
AC/DC, an Australian rock band, Malcolm and Angus Young
The Aces, an American band with two sisters, Cristal Ramirez and Alisa Ramirez
Ace of Base, a Swedish quartet that includes three Berggren siblings
Addrisi Brothers, an American pop singing/songwriting duo from Winthrop, Massachusetts
After 7, an American R&B group founded in 1987 by brothers Melvin & Kevon Edmonds, and Keith Mitchell
AJR, an American, indie-pop band of brothers consisting of Adam, Jack, and Ryan Met
Akdong Musician, a brother-sister K-pop duo
Aleka's Attic, alternative band formed by River Phoenix and his sister Rain
Alessi Brothers (aka Alessi), an American pop rock singer-songwriter duo Billy & Bobby Alessi (identical twins)
The Alley Cats, vocal group from Los Angeles, CA with brothers Gary & Chester Pipkin
The Allman Brothers Band, an American southern jam band led by Gregg Allman and the late Duane Allman
Aly and AJ Michalka, sisters, known briefly as 78violet
Ames Brothers, a singing quartet from Malden, MA, who were particularly famous in the 1950s for their traditional pop music hits
Anathema, an English band, formerly death-doom metal, later alternative rock, Daniel, Vincent, and Jamie Cavanagh; John and Lee Douglas 
And Also The Trees, an English post-punk band with poetic lyrics. Brothers Justin and Simon Huw Jones
The Andrews Sisters, an American close-harmony singing group, LaVerne Sophia, Maxene Angelyn, and Patricia "Patty" Marie Andrews
The Angels, a New Jersey American girl group best known for their 1963 No. 1 hit single "My Boyfriend's Back"
Angus & Julia Stone, an Australian brother-sister folk and indie pop group
The Anointed Pace Sisters, American gospel group of 8 Pace sisters (Duranice, Phyllis, June, Melonda, Dejualii, Lydia, Latrice and Leslie) plus occasional member, sister LaShun Pace
Appleton, Appleton were a Canadian musical duo consisting of the Appleton sisters. The sisters were better known as members of the girl group All Saints
The Arbors, American pop vocal group, two sets of brothers, Tom and Scott Herrick, with twins Ed and Fred Farran
Arcade Fire, Canadian indie rock band, Win and Will Butler
Arch Enemy, a Swedish melodic death-metal band, Michael and Christopher Amott
Archie and the Bunkers punk duo from Cleveland, Ohio, Cullen and Emmett O'Connor
Architects, British rock band, twin brothers Dan and Tom Searle
Atlantic Starr, an American band from White Plains, NY who had a No. 1 hit "Always"
The Avett Brothers, American folk band
The Bachelors, a pop music group, originating from Dublin, Ireland, with brothers Con & Dec Cluskey
Bachman-Turner Overdrive, Canadian rock band from Winnipeg Manitoba Randy, Tim, and Robbie Bachman
Bad Brains  rock band formed in Washington, D.C. in 1976 Earl and Paul Hudson aka H.R.
The Band Perry, an American music group composed of siblings Kimberly, Reid, and Neil Perry
The Bangles, American pop band with sisters Vicki and Debbi Peterson
Barbarellas an Irish pop duo, consisting of twins Edele and Keavy Lynch
The Barr Brothers, an indie folk band founded in Montreal, Quebec
Bauhaus, English gothic band, David J. and Kevin Haskins
Bay City Rollers, Scottish pop band, Andy (bass) and Derek (drums) Longmuir
Beach Boys, an American rock band, Brian, Carl, and Dennis Wilson
Bear Mountain, an alternative Canadian dance electronic group, with identical twins Ian and Greg Bevis
Beau Coup, an American rock band from Cleveland, Ohio
BeBe & CeCe Winans, American gospel music brother/sister duo
The Bee Gees, a British–Australian harmonic pop group, Barry, Robin, and Maurice Gibb
The Bellamy Brothers, an American country-rock band, David and Howard
The Belle Brigade, American duo, Barbara and Ethan Gruska
Belly, an alternative rock band formed in Rhode Island
The Beu Sisters, a pop-rock girl group from the U.S. state of Florida, consisting of the sisters Candice, Christie and Danielle
The B-52's, an American new wave band formed in Athens, Georgia, in 1976, Cindy and Ricky Wilson
Biffy Clyro, a Scottish Rock Band, identical twins James and Ben Johnston
Billie Eilish, American singer/songwriter and her brother Finneas O'Connell
The Black Crowes, American rock band, Chris and Rich Robinson
Blackfoot Sue, a British pop/rock band, formed in 1970 by the twin brothers Tom and David Farmer and Eddie Golga
The Blasters, American rock band, Phil and Dave Alvin
Bleached, punk rock band consisting of sisters Jennifer and Jessica Clavin
The Blossoms, an oft-uncredited female backing vocal group whose original line-up included twin sisters Annette and Nanette Williams
Blue, a Scottish pop rock band, formed in Glasgow in 1973
The Blue Diamonds, an Indonesia-born Dutch vocal duo, brothers Ruud de Wolff and Riem de Wolff
Blue October, Justin and Jeremy Furstenfeld
Blue Öyster Cult, an American rock band, brothers Joe and Albert Bouchard.
Blues Traveler, an American blues-rock band formed in Princeton, NJ. Chan (guitar) Kinchia's brother, Tad (bass), joined group in 1999.
Boards of Canada, a Scottish electronic music duo consisting of brothers Mike Sandison and Marcus Eoin
The Bobbettes, an American R&B girl group, sisters Jannie and Emma Pought
The Bonnie Sisters, an American pop group
Boo-Yaa T.R.I.B.E., an American hip-hop group, brothers Ted, Paul, Vincent, Donald, Danny, and Roscoe Devoux
The Boswell Sisters, an American close harmony singing group, Martha, Connee and Helvetia "Vet" Boswell
Boyfriend, South Korean boy band with identical twins, Jo Youngmin and Jo Kwangmin (commonly known as the 'Jo Twins')
Brandi Carlile, an American alternative country and folk rock artist whose band and songwriters include the twins Tim and Phil Hanseroth
The Braxtons, an American R&B girl group, sisters Toni, Tamar, Trina, Towanda, and Traci Braxton
Breakfast Club, Pop-dance group from NYC, with brothers Dan & Ed Gilroy, best known for hit single "Right on Track"
The Breeders, an American alternative rock band, identical twin sisters Kim and Kelley Deal
Brecker Brothers, an American jazz fusion duo, Michael Brecker (saxophone) and Randy Brecker (trumpet)
Brick & Lace, Jamaican dancehall/R&B (or reggae fusion) musical duo consisting of sisters Nyanda and Nailah Thorbourne
Brix & the Extricated post punk band made up of former members of The Fall including Paul and Steve Hanley
Broods, a New Zealand musical duo, consisting of lead vocalist Georgia Josiena Nott and older brother Caleb Allan Joseph Nott
Bros, British band, Matt and Luke Goss
The Brothers Comatose, a five-piece bluegrass band based out of San Francisco, California
The Brothers Johnson, an American funk, Motown and R&B band consisting of brothers George and Louis E. Johnson
Brothers Osborne, an American country music duo consisting of brothers T.J. Osborne and John Osborne
The Browns, an American country and folk music vocal trio best known for their 1959 Grammy-nominated hit, "The Three Bells"
B. T. Express, an American funk/disco group, that had a number of successful songs during the 1970s
Buck-Tick, a Japanese visual kei band, Yutaka Higuchi (bass) and Toll Yagami (drums)
The Burns Sisters, folk/pop/rock trio with a Celtic slant
The BusBoys, R&B group from Los Angeles best known for their appearance in the 1982 film 48 Hrs.
B*Witched, an Irish girl group consisting of twin sisters Edele and Keavy Lynch, Lindsay Armaou and Sinéad O'Carroll
Café Tacuba, a Mexican band, Joselo and Quique Arroyo
Cage The Elephant, an American rock band, Matt and Brad Shultz
Cannibal & the Headhunters, an American vocal group from East Los Angeles best known for their hit single "Land of 1000 Dances"
The Cannonball Adderley Quintet, American jazz group featuring Cannonball and Nat Adderley
Cap'n Jazz, an American emo band, Tim and Mike Kinsella
Cardiacs, English rock band, Tim and Jim Smith
The Carpenters, American melodic pop duo, Karen and Richard Carpenter
Cavalera Conspiracy, a Brazilian heavy metal supergroup, Max and Igor Cavalera
The Chambers Brothers, an American soul band including George, Joe, Lester, and Willie Chambers
Chancho en Piedra, a Chilean funk rock band, Pablo and Felipe Ilabaca
Charlie Belle, an American indie pop band, Jendayi and Gyasi Bonds
Charly Bliss, an American power pop band, Eva and Sam Hendricks
The Cheater Slicks American garage punk band formed in 1987. Dave and Tom Shannon.
Cheeky Girls, a Romanian pop music duo, Gabriela and Monica Irimia
Chevelle, an American rock trio, Pete, Sam and Joe Loeffler
Chloe x Halle, a R&B sister duo. 
The Chicks formally Dixie Chicks, an American country music group, Martie Maguire and Emily Robison
The Christians (band), a musical ensemble from Liverpool, England, originally featured three brothers, Garry, Roger, and Russell Christian
The Clancy Brothers, an influential Irish folk group that initially developed as a part of the American folk music revival
The Clark Family Experience, an American country music band composed of six brothers
The Clark Sisters, an American gospel vocal group consisting of five sisters
Clefs of Lavender Hill, a rock vocal group from Miami, Florida, formed around the nucleus of brother and sister Travis and Coventry Fairchild
Cleopatra, teen vocal trio originally based in Manchester, England with sisters Cleo, Yonah, and Zainam Higgins
The Clingers, the first American girl rock group to play their own instruments
Clipse, American hip-hop duo, brothers known as No Malice and Pusha T
The Cramps, the short-lived original lineup included Pam "Balam" on drums the sister of guitarist Bryan Gregory
CocoRosie, an American duo, sisters Bianca "Coco" and Sierra "Rosie" Casady
Collective Soul, an American post-grunge band, Ed Roland and Dean Roland
Consumed, an English Melodic Hardcore band, originally featuring brothers Steve and Mike Ford
The Cooper Brothers, a Canadian southern rock band founded in Ottawa, Ontario, by brothers Brian & Dick Cooper and their long-time friend Terry King
Cornelius Brothers & Sister Rose, a family soul singing group from Dania Beach, Florida, formed in 1970
Cornershop, a British indie rock band featuring siblings Tjinder and Avtar Singh
The Corrs, a Celtic folk rock band, Andrea, Sharon, Caroline, and Jim Corr
The Corsairs, an American doo-wop ensemble from La Grange, North Carolina
Cowboy Junkies, an alternative country and folk rock band, featuring siblings Michael Timmins (guitar), Peter Timmins (drums), and Margo Timmins (vocals)
The Cowsills, an American popular music family band that includes siblings Bill, Bob, Paul, Barry, John, and Susan
The Cranberries, an Irish alternative rock band formed in Limerick, Ireland in 1989 that included brothers Mike and Noel Hogan
Creedence Clearwater Revival, an American rock band, John Fogerty and Tom Fogerty
Crash Test Dummies, a pop-rock group from Winnipeg, Manitoba
The Crew-Cuts, a Canadian vocal quartet, that made a number of popular records that charted in the United States and worldwide in the mid-1950s
The Cribs, indie rock band, identical twins Gary and Ryan Jarman, and younger brother Ross
Crowded House, an Australian pop band including brother Neil and Tim Finn.
Cherie and Marie Currie, American rock band, consisting of the eponymous identical twin singer/songwriters
Da Youngsta's, an American hip-hop trio from Philadelphia, Pennsylvania, that consisted of brothers Taji "Taj Mahal" Goodman & Qu'ran "Q-Ball" Goodman and their cousin Tarik "Reek Geez" Dawson
Dandelion, an alternative rock band from Philadelphia, Pennsylvania formed in 1989
Danny Wilson, a Scottish pop group formed in Dundee, Scotland, best known for its 1988 UK number 3 hit single "Mary's Prayer"
The Darkness, an English rock band, Justin and Dan Hawkins
The Dear Hunter, an American progressive rock band, Nick and Casey Crescenzo
Death proto-punk band formed in Detroit as a funk band 1971 by brothers Bobby (bass, vocals), David (guitar), and Dannis (drums) Hackney
DeBarge, an American R&B music group composed of brothers Mark, Randy, El, Bobby, James, and sister Bunny
The DeCastro Sisters, a female vocal trio from Cuba originally consisted of sisters Peggy, Cherie & Babette DeCastro
Deep Blue Something, an American rock band who are best known for their 1995 hit single "Breakfast at Tiffany's"
The DeJohn Sisters, an American vocal duo, Julie & Dux DeJohn (born DiGiovanni)
The DeFranco Family, a 1970s pop music group consisting entirely of siblings
Deicide, American death metal band, Eric and Brian Hoffman
The Del Fuegos, a 1980s garage rock band with brothers Warren Zanes & Dan Zanes
The Delfonics, an American R&B/soul vocal group, brothers Wilbert and William Hart
Delta Rae, an American folk rock band from Durham, North Carolina, including three siblings Ian, Eric, and Brittany Hölljes
The Detroit Emeralds, R&B vocal group from Little Rock, Arkansas, originally composed of four brothers, Ivory, Abrim, Cleophus & Raymond Tilmon
Devo, an American new-wave band, Mark and Bob Mothersbaugh, with Gerald and Bob Casale
Dire Straits, a British rock band, Mark and David Knopfler
Disclosure, a British Electro-pop band, Howard and Guy Lawrence
Dis-n-Dat, R&B duo of sisters Tishea (Dis) & Tenesia (Dat) Bennett
The Dixie Cups, a girl group, with sisters Barbara Ann & Rosa Lee Hawkins and their cousin Joan Marie Johnson, who had a No. 1 hit "Chapel of Love" in 1964
Dr. Buzzard's Original Savannah Band, a 1970s big band- and swing-influenced disco band, formed in the Bronx, New York
The Dorsey Brothers, an American jazz group fronted by Tommy and Jimmy
Doves, a British alternative rock band, Jez and Andy Williams
The Dreamlovers, an American doo-wop group from Philadelphia, Pennsylvania best known for their 1961 hit "When We Get Married"
Earth, Wind & Fire, an American band that has spanned the musical genres of R&B, soul, funk, jazz, disco, pop, rock, dance, Latin, and Afro pop
Echosmith, an American indie pop band composed of four siblings
Eighth Wonder, an English pop band, brother Jamie and sister Patsy Kensit
Elusion, a female R&B group that consisted of two separate sets of identical twin sisters
Embrace, a British Britpop band, Danny and Richard McNamara
The Emotions, an American R&B group, founded by sisters Sheila, Wanda and Jeanette Hutchinson, with sister Pamela later replacing Jeanette
The Equals, a British rock group, with twin brothers, best remembered for their 1968 hit "Baby, Come Back"
Eruption, a techno-funk-dance group of Jamaican natives based in London, best known for their cover of "I Can't Stand the Rain"
Evan and Jaron, Pop-rock duo of identical twin brothers Evan Lowenstein & Jaron Lowenstein
The Everly Brothers, an American country-influenced band, Philip and Isaac Donald Everly
Every Mother's Son, an American sunshine pop band formed in New York City, best known for their 1967 Top 10 hit "Come On Down to My Boat"
The Fall some lineups included  Paul and Steve Hanley
The Family Rain, an English blues-rock band, brothers William, Ollie and Timothy Walter
Fanny, an American all-female band, June Millington and Jean Millington
The Faragher Brothers, a soft rock family musical group from California consisting originally of brothers Tommy, Davey, Jimmy & Danny Faragher
Felice Brothers, American folk rock band, brothers Ian, James and Simone Felice
Felony, an American new wave and rock band formed in Los Angeles, California, in the early 1970s by brothers Jeff & Joe Spry
The Fergies, Australian folk/indie/pop/rock band consisting of siblings Daniel, Shani, Nathan, Joel, and Kahlia Ferguson
Field Music, English indie pop/rock band consisting of brothers David and Peter Brewis
The Fiery Furnaces, an American indie rock band, siblings Matthew Friedberger and Eleanor Friedberger
First Aid Kit, a Swedish folk duo, sisters Klara and Johanna Söderberg
The Five Keys, an American R&B vocal group, initially consisting of two sets of brothers, that was instrumental in shaping this genre in the 1950s
Five Man Electrical Band, a Canadian rock group from Ottawa, Ontario, best known for their 1971 hit single "Signs"
The Five Stairsteps, an American R&B band composed of brothers Clarence Burke Jr., Keni Burke, Alohe Burke, James Burke, Dennis Burke, and Cubie Burke
Five Star, a British pop group, formed in 1983 and comprising siblings Stedman, Lorraine, Denise, Doris and Delroy Pearson
The Flames, a musical rock group from Durban in South Africa featuring the Fataar brothers
The Flirtations, an all-female musical group who have recorded since the early 1960s
The Floaters, an American R&B vocal group, from Detroit, Michigan, best known for their 1977 song "Float On"
A Flock of Seagulls, an English new wave and synth-pop band originally formed in 1979 in Liverpool, England 
The Frogs rock music band founded in 1980, in Milwaukee, Wisconsin, by brothers Jimmy and Dennis Flemion
The Fontane Sisters, a trio (Bea, Geri and Marge Rosse) from New Milford, New Jersey
The Fools, a Massachusetts rock band best known for the party atmosphere of their live performances and tongue-in-cheek original songs, covers and parodies
Force MDs, an American R&B vocal group that was formed in 1981 in Staten Island, New York, considered major forerunners of the new jack swing movement
The Forester Sisters, an American country music vocal group consisting of sisters Kathy, June, Kim, and Christy Forester
The Four Cohans, an American vaudeville act featuring George M. Cohan and Josie Cohen Niblo
The Four Coins, a vocal group from Canonsburg, Pennsylvania who had five Top 40 singles in the 1950s
The Four King Cousins, an American pop vocal group, Tina Cole and sister Cathy Cole Green with their cousins Carolyn Cameron and Candy Brand
The Four Freshmen, Jazz-styled, vocal/instrumental group from Indianapolis, Indiana who had a top 20 hit "Graduation Day" in 1956
The Frank And Walters, an Irish indie pop, brothers Paul and Niall Linehan
The Free Movement, an American R&B vocal group from Los Angeles, best known for their 1971 Top 10 single, "I've Found Someone of My Own"
The Gap Band, an American R&B group fronted by brothers Charlie, Robert, and Ronnie Wilson
The Garden, duo from Orange County, California consisting of twins Wyatt and Fletcher Shears
Gardiner Sisters, a Canadian-American close-harmony acoustic pop singer/songwriter group, Hailey, Allie, Mandi, Lindsay, Abby, and Lucy Gardiner
Gary and the Hornets, was a Franklin, Ohio-based garage rock band that consisted of three brothers: Gary, Greg, and Steve Calvert
The G-Clefs, an American R&B vocal group, brothers Teddy, Chris, Tim and Arnold Scott
Gene Loves Jezebel, British alternative rock band with identical twin brothers, Jay and Michael Aston
Gentle Giant, British progressive rock band active in the 1970s, with core members including brothers Phil, Derek and Ray Shurman
Gerry and the Pacemakers, an English beat group prominent in the 1960s Merseybeat scene
Gibson Brothers, disco group originating from Martinique and comprising brothers Alex, Chris and Patrick Gibson. 
Gojira, French metal band, vocalist/guitarist Joe and drummer Mario DuPlantier
Good Charlotte, an American pop punk band, identical twins Joel and Benji Madden
Good Question, an R&B and dance music vocal duo from Philadelphia, Pennsylvania, composed of brothers Sean and Marc Douglas
 The Goossens family, grandfather and father were conductors, five children were all professional musician: Eugène (conductor/composer), Léon (oboe), Marie and Sidonie (both harpists), Adolphe (French horn).
Grapefruit, psychedelic rock group from England in the late 1960s
The Greenwood County Singers, Folk group from Los Angeles, California consisting of seven men and two women (brothers Carson Parks & Van Dyke Parks were members) 
Greta Van Fleet, an American Rock band formed in 2012, Josh, Jake, and Sam Kiszka
 The Grimson family, a father and seven children who were all active classical musicians (piano and strings). They flourished in London from the early 1870s.
Guy, an American hip hop, R&B and soul group founded in Harlem, New York in 1987, Aaron and Damion Hall
The Haden Triplets, American bluegrass/country trio, triplet sisters Petra, Rachel and Tanya Haden
Haim - sisters Este, Danielle and Alana Haim
Halestorm, an American hard rock band, Arejay and Lzzy Hale
Half Japanese, American art punk band, Jad and David Fair
Hamilton Sisters, Pearl and Violet of the Three X Sisters harmony trio
Hanson, an American pop rock band, Isaac, Taylor, and Zac Hanson
Happy Mondays, an English rock band, brothers Shaun and Paul Ryder
The Harden Trio, an American country music group, siblings Bobby Harden and his sisters, Robbie and Arlene
Heart, an American rock band, Ann and Nancy Wilson
Heatwave, a UK based funk/disco band that featured American brothers Johnnie Wilder Jr. and Keith Wilder
The Hesitations, an American R&B group from Cleveland, Ohio with brothers George "King" Scott & Charles Scott
High Inergy, a late 1970s American R&B and soul girl group best known for their hit, "You Can't Turn Me Off (In the Middle of Turning Me On)"
Highly Suspect, an American rock trio, founded by twin brothers Rich and Ryan Meyer
The Hillside Singers, an American folk group assembled to sing "I'd Like to Teach the World to Sing (In Perfect Harmony)" for a television commercial
The Hives, Swedish rock Band, Pelle and Niklas Almqvist
The Honeycombs, English 1960s pop group best known for the single "Have I the Right?". Included siblings John and Anne "Honey" Lantree
H-Town, an American R&B vocal group from Houston, Texas, United States founded in 1990 by twin brothers Keven "Dino" Conner, Solomon “Shazam" Conner and their longtime friend Darryl "GI" Jackson
The Hudson Brothers, an American musical group formed in Portland, Oregon, consisting of brothers Bill Hudson, Brett Hudson and Mark Hudson
Ibeyi, an Afro-French Cuban musical duo consisting of twin sisters Lisa-Kaindé Diaz and Naomi Diaz
The Impressions, an American music group originally formed in 1958 whose line-up included brothers Richard & Arthur Brooks until 1962
In the Nursery, English martial industrial band, consisting of twin brothers Klive and Nigel Humberstone 
Instant Funk, an American 1970s and 1980s disco band, brothers Kim and Scotty Miller
INXS, Australian rock band, Tim, Andrew, and Jon Farriss
IV Xample, a 1990s American vocal quartet from Los Angeles who and are best remembered for their 1995 single "I'd Rather Be Alone"
Isley Brothers, American pop (soul) band, O'Kelly, Rudolph, and Ronald Isley
The Jackson 5, an American popular music family group, Jackie, Tito, Jermaine (later replaced by Randy), Marlon, and Michael Jackson
Jagged Edge, an American R&B group whose members include identical twin lead singers Brandon and Brian Casey
Jan & Kjeld, a Danish musical duo of brothers Jan and Kjeld Wennick
Japan, English band, brothers David Sylvian and Steve Jansen
The Jazz Brothers, American jazz group, featuring Chuck and Gap Mangione
The Jelly Beans, a rhythm and blues vocal group from Jersey City, New Jersey formed in 1962 by five high schoolers
Jellyfish, an American rock band formed in San Francisco in 1989 whose line-up included brothers Roger & Chris Manning
The Jesus and Mary Chain, Scottish noise band, Jim and William Reid
Jet - Australian rock band, Nic and Chris Cester
The Jets, an America pop band, LeRoy, Haiti, Rudy, Kathi, Elizabeth and Moana Wolfgramm, and adopted siblings Eddie Lavatai and Eugene Hunt
Jo Jo Gunne, an American rock band with brothers Mark & Matt Andes
Jocelyn and Chris Arndt, an American blues-rock band
Jodeci, an American R&B quartet comprising two brother duos
The Johnstons, an Irish folk band, sisters Adrienne and Lucy Johnston
Jonas Brothers, an American pop rock band, Kevin, Joe, and Nick Jonas
The Jones Girls, an American R&B vocal trio of sisters Brenda, Shirley and Valorie Jones
The Jordan Brothers, an American musical group of brothers Joseph,  Frank, Robert, and Lewis Jordan
Jump5, an American dance-pop group active in contemporary Christian music from 1999 to 2007
The Justin Holt Band, a country band from Alabama, Vocals/Acoustic Gtr Justin Holt, Drummer Johnny Holt
Kalin Twins, a pop music recording and songwriting duo comprising twin brothers Harold Kalin and Herbert Kalin
Kalmah, a Finnish melodic death metal band, Pekka and Antti Kokko
The Mary Kaye Trio, an American musical group, Mary Kaye and her brother Norman Kaye
The Kendall Sisters, sisters Polly and Dolly Kendall, a rock and roll duo, whose single "Yea, Yea" peaked at #73 in Billboard's Hot 100 in 1958
Killing Heidi, an Australian rock band formed in 1996, featuring siblings Ella Hooper (lead vocals) and Jesse Hooper (lead guitar)
The Kimberlys, country vocal group from Oklahoma comprising brothers Harold & Carl Kimberly and their spouses
The King Pins, R&B vocal group from Clarksdale, Mississippi with brothers Andrew, Curtis & Robert Kelly, charted in Billboard Hot 100 in 1963
The Knife, a Swedish electronic music duo from Gothenburg formed in 1999, consisting of siblings Karin and Olof Dreijer
The King Sisters, an American Grammy nominated vocal group, Yvonne, Alyce, Luise and Marilyn King
Kings of Leon, an American rock band, Caleb, Nathan, and Jared Followill
Kings of the Sun, hard rock group from Sydney, Australia with brothers Jefferey & Clifford Hoad
The Kinks, an English rock band, Ray and Dave Davies
The Kinleys, an American country music duo composed of identical twin sisters Heather and Jennifer Kinley
Mac and Katie Kissoon, a male and female vocal duo, consisting of brother and sister Mac & Katie Kissoon
Kitty, Daisy & Lewis, British band fronted by siblings of the Durham family
Klique, an American R&B trio, consisting of Howard Huntsberry, Isaac Suthers and his sister, Deborah Suthers
The Knickerbockers, an American rock band, formed in Bergenfield, New Jersey, who are best remembered for their 1965 Beatles sound-alike hit single "Lies"
Gladys Knight & the Pips, an R&B/soul family musical act from Atlanta, Georgia that remained active on the music charts and performing circuit for three decades
Kongos, South-African born American alternative rock band, Daniel, Dylan, Jesse, and Johnny Kongos
Kool & the Gang, an American band formed in Jersey City, New Jersey, in 1964 by brothers Robert "Kool" Bell and Ronald Bell
Krisiun, Brazilian death metal band, consisting of brothers Alex Camargo, Max Kolesne and Moysés Kolesne
K's Choice, a Belgian rock band from Antwerp, core members are siblings Sam Bettens and Gert Bettens
The La's, an English rock band from Liverpool, fronted by singer, songwriter and guitarist Lee Mavers
Las Ketchup, a Spanish girl group of sisters, best known for the 2002 hit single, "The Ketchup Song (Aserejé)"
Lamb of God, an American metal band, Will and Chris Adler
Lanier & Co., an American R&B-soul-funk band, Farris Lanier, Jr. and his brothers Marlon and Fenoye 
Larkin Poe, an American roots rock band, sisters Rebecca and Megan Lovell
Lawrence, an American soul-pop band led by Clyde and Gracie Lawrence
Len, Canadian alternative rock band, Marc Costanzo and Sharon Costanzo
The Lemon Twigs, an American rock band duo from Long Island, New York, fronted by brothers Brian and Michael D'Addario
The Lennon Sisters, an American pop vocal group, Dianne, Peggy, Kathy, Janet, and Mimi Lennon
Level 42, an English jazz-funk band, brothers Boon Gould and Phil Gould
LeVert, an American R&B group, consisting of brothers Gerald and Sean Levert 
Lijadu Sisters, Nigerian jazz/disco band, identical twins Taiwo and Kehinde Lijadu
Lily & Madeleine, American folk pop band consisting of sisters Lily and Madeleine Jurkiewicz
Limmie & Family Cookin', an American family pop group from Canton, Ohio
Lit, an American rock band formed in Orange County, California best known for their 1999 song "My Own Worst Enemy"
Los Bunkers, a Chilean rock band, Mauricio and Francisco Durán, with Álvaro and Gonzalo López
Los Indios Tabajaras, a guitar duo of two brothers, Antenor Lima and Natalicio (Nato) Lima, from Ceará in the Northeast of Brazil
Los Jaivas, a Chilean progressive-rock-andino band, Eduardo, Claudio and Gabriel Parra
Los Lonely Boys, the Garza brothers – vocalist/guitarist Henry, bassist/vocalist Jojo, and drummer/ vocalist Ringo
The Lost Generation, an American soul group from Chicago, Illinois with brothers Lowrell Simon & Fred Simon
The Louvin Brothers, American duo, Ira and Charlie Louvin
The Love Generation, an American pop rock band from the 1960s founded by brothers John Bahler and Tom Bahler
Love Like Blood, German gothic rock/metal band, with brothers Yorck and Gunnar Eysel
Love Spit Love, an alternative rock band founded in 1992 by singer Richard Butler during the 1990s hiatus of the Psychedelic Furs
Love Unlimited, a female vocal trio that included Barry White's future wife, Glodean James, her sister, Linda James, and their cousin Diane Taylor 
Lovehammers, an American rock band, Dino and Bobby Kourelis
The Lovelites, an American vocal group, based in Chicago, originally composed of the sisters Patti Hamilton and Rozena Petty plus their friend, Barbara Peterman
L.T.D., an American R&B/funk band best known for their 1977 hit single, "(Every Time I Turn Around) Back in Love Again"
The Maccabees, British indie rock band, brothers Felix, Hugo, and Will White
Madina Lake, an American rock band, identical twins Nathan and Matthew Leone
The Magic Numbers, an English rock band, Angela and Sean Gannon with Michele and Romeo Stodart
The Marshall Tucker Band, an American rock band from Spartanburg, South Carolina that helped establish the Southern rock genre in the early 1970s
Mason Proffit, an American Country Rock group formed by brothers Terryry and John Michael Talbot
The McCoys, a rock group formed in Union City, Indiana, best known for their 1965 #1 single "Hang on Sloopy"
The McCrarys, an American family Gospel and R&B group best known for their 1978 single "You"
Kate & Anna McGarrigle, a duo of Canadian singer-songwriters from Quebec
The McGuire Sisters, a singing trio, composed of three sisters, in American popular music
Meat Puppets, an American rock band formed in January 1980 in Phoenix, Arizona with Curt Kirkwood, his brother Cris Kirkwood, and Derrick Bostrom
Mel and Kim, a British pop duo, consisting of sisters Melanie Appleby & Kim Appleby
Melim, a Brazilian R&B group formed by Rodrigo, Gabriela and Diogo
Melky Sedeck, a Haitian-American R&B duo formed by Blandinna Melky Jean and Farel Sedeck Guerschom Jean (a younger sister and younger brother of hip-hop star Wyclef Jean)
Men Without Hats, a Canadian new wave and synth-pop band, originally from Montreal, Quebec
Midi, Maxi & Efti,  a Swedish musical group, with African influences, consisted of the two twin sisters Midi and Maxi Berhanu and their friend Freweyni "Efti" Teclehaimanot
Midnight Star, R&B dance group formed at Kentucky State University in 1976 whose most successful line-up included brothers	Reginald Calloway & Vincent Calloway
Milburn, an indie rock band from Sheffield, England, that consisted of Joe Carnall, Louis Carnall, Tom Rowley, and Joe Green
The Mills Brothers, an American Vocal Harmony Group, John, Herbert, Harry and Donald
The Miracles,  an American R&B vocal group that was the first successful recording act for Motown Records, and one of the most important & influential groups of the 1960s
Misery Signals, an American hardcore band, Brandon and Ryan Morgan
The Misfits, American horror-punk band, Jerry Only and Doyle Wolfgang von Frankenstein (brothers)
Mocedades, Spanish singing group, Amaya, Izaskun, and Estibaliz Uranga
The Moffatts, a Canadian pop/rock band, Scott and triplets Bob, Clint, and Dave. The fraternal twins Bob and Clint later formed a duo called Same Same.
Mulberry Lane, a pop music vocal group from Omaha, Nebraska consisting of the Rizzuto sisters, Heather, Rachel, Allie, and Jaymie Jones
The Murder Junkies, last backing band for GG Allin his brother Merle Allin the bassist continued the group after his death with other singers.
The Murmaids, an American one-hit wonder all-female vocal trio composed of sisters Carol & Terry Fischer and Sally Gordon
Musical Youth, a British Jamaican reggae band formed in 1979 in Birmingham, England best remembered for their successful 1982 single "Pass the Dutchie"
My Chemical Romance, an American rock band, Mikey and Gerard Way
Naked Brothers Band, an American rock band Alex and Nat Wolff
The National, an American rock band, Bryce and Aaron Dessner (identical twins) with Scott and Bryan Devendorf
Nazia and Zoheb, were a Pakistani Pop group, Nazia Hassan, Zoheb Hassan
Nelson, an American Rock Band, identical twins Matthew and Gunnar Nelson
New Kids on the Block, (NKOTB), an American boy band from Dorchester, Massachusetts comprising brothers Jonathan and Jordan Knight, Joey McIntyre, Donnie Wahlberg and Danny Wood
The Newbeats, an American popular music vocal trio, Larry Henley & Mathis brothers, best known for their 1964 hit "Bread and Butter"
The Neville Brothers, an American R&B group from New Orleans, Aaron, Art, Cyril and Charles
Nickelback, a Canadian rock band formed in 1995 in Hanna, Alberta, Canada, whose members include brothers Chad & Mike Kroeger
Nina Sky, an American musical duo consisting of identical twins Nicole and Natalie Albino. Best known for their 2004 debut single "Move Ya Body" which reached number four on the Billboard Hot 100.
No Doubt, an American rock band, Gwen and Eric Stefani
No Mercy, a male techno-dance trio with twin brothers Ariel and Gabriel Hernández
No Name, a Slovak pop/rock band, Igor, Roman, Dušan and Ivan Timko
The Nolans, an Irish/English family music group, Bernie, Anne, Maureen, Linda, Coleen, and Denise
NRBQ, an American rock band whose members included brothers Joey and Johnny Spampinato
Oasis, an English rock band, Liam and Noel Gallagher
Obituary, American death metal band, John and Donald Tardy
October Tide, a Swedish metal band, Fredrik and Mattais Norrman
The Okee Dokee Brothers, an independent American bluegrass and American roots children's music duo from Minneapolis
Olsen Brothers, Danish pop-rock duo
Orbital, English electronic music duo, brothers Phil and Paul Hartnoll
Orleans, an American pop-rock group formed in Woodstock, New York that included brothers Larry and Lance Hoppen
The Osborne Brothers, an influential and popular bluegrass act during the 1960s and 70s, best known for their 1967 country hit song "Rocky Top"
The Osmonds, an American family music group, Alan, Wayne, Merrill, Jay, Donny, Marie, and Jimmy Osmond
The Other Ones, a pop rock band which formed in Berlin in 1984 with Alf Klimek and twins Jayney Klimek and Johnny Klimek 
The Pagans, punk band formed in Cleveland in 1974, Brian and Mike Hudson 
Palaye Royale, an American rock band,Sebastian Danzig, Remington Leith and Emerson Barrett 
Pantera, an American heavy metal band, Dimebag Darrell and Vinnie Paul Abbott
Paramore, an American rock band, Josh and Zac Farro
Parquet Courts, an American rock band, Andy and Max Savage
The Pasadenas,  a British R&B/pop group with twins Mike and David Milliner
Pastilla, a U.S based Latin Alternative Rock band, Victor "Chicles" Monroy and Adrian Monroy
Patience and Prudence, two sisters who were a young vocal duo active from 1956 to 1964
People!, an American rock band, Geoff Levin and Robb Levin
Pernice Brothers, an American indie rock band, Joe and Bob Pernice
The Peppermint Rainbow,  an American sunshine pop group from Baltimore, Maryland with sisters Bonnie and Patty Lamdin
Peppermint Trolley Company, an American sunshine pop band, with brothers Danny and Jimmy Faragher, known for their 1968 single "Baby You Come Rollin' 'Cross My Mind"
The Pierces, an American folk-pop band, Allison and Catherine Pierce
Pierce the Veil, an American experimental post-hardcore band, Vic and Mike Fuentes
Pleasure, R&B group from Portland, Oregon whose core members include brothers Donald and Michael Hepburn
The Pleasure Seekers Detroit all-female band which became Cradle. Formed by Suzi Quatro and included at various times her sisters Nancy, Arlene and Patti. 
Plumtree, a Canadian indie rock/power pop band with sisters Carla and Lynette Gillis. They now perform in the rock band SISTER (now known as Overnight) and also perform in Bells Clanging.
P.M. Dawn, an American hip hop and R&B act formed in 1988 by the brothers Attrell Cordes and Jarrett Cordes in Jersey City, New Jersey
Promises, A Canadian band with sister Leslie Maria Knauer and brothers, Jed Knauer and Benny Knauer
The Pointer Sisters, an American R&B group, Ruth, Anita, Bonnie, June
Ponderosa Twins Plus One, an American soul vocal group formed in 1970 in Cleveland, Ohio featuring two sets of identical twins: Alfred & Alvin Pelham and Keith & Kirk Gardner
The Proclaimers, a Scottish vocal band, twins Charlie Reid and Craig Reid
The Psychedelic Furs, English rock band, Richard (singer) and Tim Butler (bass guitar)
The Puppies, a child hip hop duo composed of brother and sister Calvin "Big Boy" Mills III and Tamara Dee Mills
Radiohead, an English alternative rock band, Jonny and Colin Greenwood
The Rainy Daze, a psychedelic pop group formed in Denver, Colorado in 1965 that included brothers Tim and Kip Gilbert
The Ramrods, an American instrumental pop group formed in 1956 by Claire Lane (born Claire Litke) and her brother Rich Litke
The Ran-Dells, Rock & roll trio from Villas, New Jersey, that included brothers Steve and Robert Rappaport and their cousin John Spirt
Randy & the Rainbows, an American doo-wop group from Maspeth, New York that featured two pairs of siblings, along with a fifth member
Raybon Brothers, a country duo from Sanford, Florida, consisting of brothers Marty Raybon and Tim Raybon
Redbone, a Native American rock and soul band, founded by brothers Pat and Lolly Vegas
The Reddings, an American funk, soul and disco band, founded by Otis Redding's sons Dexter and Otis Redding III, together with Mark Lockett 
Right Said Fred, a London-based English band formed by brothers Fred and Richard Fairbrass in 1989
The Roches, an Irish-American trio of singing songwriting sisters, Maggie, Terre, and Suzzy Roche
The Rocky Fellers, a Filipino-born pop/rock band composed of four brothers: Tony, Junior, Eddie and Albert Maligmat, and their father, Doroteo "Moro" Maligmat
The Ronettes, an American girl group from New York City with lead singer Veronica Bennett (Ronnie Spector), her older sister Estelle Bennett, and their cousin Nedra Talley
The Rowans, an American country-rock group, originally formed by the brothers Chris and Lorin Rowan
The Royalettes, a four-girl group from Baltimore, Maryland with sisters Sheila and Anita Ross
Royal Fools, Royal Fools is a Pop-Rock music duo from Boston, Massachusetts composed of identical twin brothers Greyson and August Suchecki
Saga, a Canadian rock band from Oakville, Ontario, Canada, whose line-up included brothers Jim and Ian Crichton
Santo & Johnny, an American rock and roll instrumental duo from Brooklyn, New York, composed of brothers Santo and Johnny Farina, best known for their instrumental melody "Sleep Walk"
Savatage, an American heavy metal band, founded by brothers Jon and Criss Oliva
Scattered Trees, an American indie-rock band from Chicago, Illinois including Jason and Baron Harper
The Secret Sisters, an Americana singing and songwriting duo consisting of sisters Laura Rogers and Lydia Slagle
Sepultura, Brazilian heavy metal band, Max and Igor Cavalera
The Shaggs, an American all-female rock and outsider music band composed of sisters Dorothy "Dot" Wiggin, Betty Wiggin, Helen and, later, Rachel Wiggin
The Shangri-Las, an American pop girl group of the 1960s that consisted of two sets of sisters, Mary Ann and Marge Ganser, and Betty and Mary Weiss
SHeDAISY, an American country music group founded in the late 1980s by sisters Kristyn Robyn Osborn, Kelsi Marie Osborn and Kassidy Lorraine Osborn
Shepherd Sisters, an American vocal quartet of four sisters born and raised in Middletown, Ohio
Sheppard, an Australian indie pop band, George, Amy and Emma Sheppard
The Sherrys, an early 1960s American girl group from Philadelphia, Pennsylvania, featuring sisters Delphine and Dinell Cook
Shoes, an American power pop band, formed in Zion, Illinois, in 1974, by brothers John and Jeff Murphy, and Gary Klebe
The Showmen, a New Orleans-based American doo-wop and R&B group formed in 1961 with brothers Dorsey "Chops" Knight & Gene "Cheater" Knight.
The Showstoppers, a four-piece vocal soul group formed in Philadelphia about 1967 by brothers, Elec Edward "Alex" Burke and Vladimir H. "Laddie" Burke
The Sidekicks, pop group from Wildwood, New Jersey, with brothers Zack and Randy Bocelle, who had a 1966 single peak at #55 in Billboard Hot 100
The Simon Sisters, an American folk duo, Carly and Lucy Simon
Sims Twins, R&B vocal duo from Los Angeles, California, brothers Bobby and Kenneth Sims, who had a 1961 single peak at #42 in Billboard Hot 100
The Singing Belles, pop duo from Brooklyn, NY, sisters Anne and Angela Berry, who had a single make Billboard Hot 100 in 1960
Sister Sledge, an American musical group with Kim, Debbie, Joni, and Kathy Sledge
Skating Polly, an American rock band, step-siblings Kelli Mayo and Peyton Bighorse, later joined by Mayo's brother Kurtis in 2017.
Skyy, an American R&B/funk/disco band based in New York City, with sisters Denise, Dolores, and Benita "Bonné" Dunning, best known for their 1981 hit, "Call Me"
Sly and the Family Stone, American funk, soul, and rock band, Sly, Freddie, Rose, and Vet Stone
The Smoke Ring, pop group from Norfolk, Nebraska, with brothers Bob, Joe, and Nick Hupp, who made Billboard Hot 100 in 1969 
Smoking Popes, an American pop punk band, Josh Caterer, Matt Caterer and Eli Caterer
Soho, an English pop trio, consisting of sisters Jacqueline (Jacqui) Cuff and Pauline Cuff, with producer Timothy London
Son by Four, a salsa music group from Puerto Rico, well known for their English U.S. pop hit "Purest of Pain (A Puro Dolor)"
Sons of Funk, R&B group from Richmond, CA with brothers G-Smooth and Dez Dynamic, and their cousins Renzo and Rico
Soul Brothers Six, an American rhythm and blues band formed in Rochester, New York, during the mid-1960s, with five brothers
Soul for Real, an R&B group from Wheatley Heights, NY (aka Soul 4 Real and Soul IV Real) 
Sounds of Sunshine, an American sunshine pop group from Los Angeles, California consisting of three brothers (aka The Wilder Brothers)
Spandau Ballet, Gary and Martin Kemp
Sparks, American pop/rock band, brothers Ron and Russell Mael
The Spencer Davis Group Steve and Muff Winwood
Split Enz, a New Zealand rock band, Tim and Neil Finn
The Stanley Brothers, an American bluegrass duo of singer-songwriters and musicians made up of brothers Carter Stanley and Ralph Stanley
Staple Singers, American gospel/soul group, Cleotha, Pervis, Mavis, Yvonne Staples (plus their father, Roebuck Staples)
Starpoint, 1980s dance group from Maryland with brothers Ernesto, George, Orlando & Gregory Phillips
The Staves, a British Folk-ish band
The Statler Brothers, American country & gospel quartet: Don Reid and Harold Reid.
Stone Temple Pilots, an American grunge/alternative rock band, Robert and Dean DeLeo
The Stooges, also known as Iggy and the Stooges, were an American proto-punk band formed in 1967 by singer Iggy Pop, guitarist Ron Asheton, drummer Scott Asheton, and bassist Dave Alexander
Stryper, an American Christian metal band, Robert Sweet and Michael Sweet
Styx, an American pop-rock band from Chicago, with eight songs that hit the Top 10 on the Billboard Hot 100, whose members include twin brothers Chuck & John Panozzo
Supergrass, an English rock band, brothers Gaz and Rob Coombes
The Sutherland Brothers, a Scottish folk and soft rock duo with brothers Gavin and Iain Sutherland
Sweet Sensation, a female freestyle-dance music trio from The Bronx, New York, composed of Betty LeBron, sisters Margie & Mari Fernandez (Sheila Vega replaced Mari in 1989)
Switch, an American R&B/funk band, with brothers Bobby and Tommy DeBarge, that found fame in the late 1970s
Switchfoot, an American rock band, Jon Foreman and brother Tim
The Swon Brothers, an American country music duo from Muskogee, Oklahoma
The Sylvers, an American R&B group, included up to eight siblings at once. Nine brothers and sisters were in the band at some point including Olympia, Leon, Charmaine, James, Edmund, Joseph, Angelina, Patricia and Foster.
Take 5, an American boy band from Orlando, Florida consisting of brothers Ryan and Jeff "Clay" Goodell, Tilky Jones, Stevie Sculthorpe, and Tim "TJ" Christofore
TAMI Show, a six-member ensemble (including sisters Cathy and Claire Massey on vocals), from Chicago, Illinois, best remembered for their US top 40 hit "The Truth"
The Tams, R&B beach music group from Atlanta, Georgia, with brothers Charles & Joseph Pope
The Tassels, a doo-wop group from New Jersey, with siblings John & Rochelle Gaudet, whose single "To A Soldier Boy" made Billboard Hot 100 in 1959
Tangarine, Dutch folk pop duo, identical twins Arnout and Sander Brinks
Tasty, twin brothers So-ryong and Dae-ryong
Tavares, an American R&B group, has always consisted of between three and five of brothers including Arthur, Antone, Perry, Victor, Feliciano and Ralph Tavares.
T-Connection, a funk and disco group from Nassau, Bahamas, whose members included brothers Theophilus "T" & Kirkwood Coakleywho
The Teen Queens, an American musical group from the 1950s, with sisters Betty and Rosie Collins, most remembered for their hit single "Eddie My Love"
Tegan and Sara, Canadian indie band, identical twin sisters Tegan Rain and Sara Kiersten Quin
Nino Tempo & April Stevens, a brother & sister singing act from Niagara Falls, New York who earned a Grammy Award for the single "Deep Purple"
Them, a rock group formed in Belfast, Northern Ireland, whose line-up included brothers Pat & Jackie McAuley, most prominently known for the rock standard "Gloria"
Three Days Grace, Canadian rock band, Matt and Brad Walst
Thrice, American rock band, with brothers Riley and Eddie Breckenridge
The Three Playmates, a female R&B doo-wop trio from Newark, New Jersey, with sisters Lucille & Alma Beatty, whose song "Sugah Wooga" made Billboard Hot 100 in 1958
Tierra, a Latin R&B band, first established in the 1970s by former El Chicano members Steve Salas (vocals) and his brother Rudy Salas (guitar)
Tim Tam And The Turn-Ons, a 1960s American rock band, from Allen Park, Michigan, with brothers Rick & Dan Wiesend
The Tin Lids, an Australian children's pop group from 1990 to 1994, Eliza-Jane 'E.J.', Elly-May, Jackie and Mahalia Barnes (the four children of Jimmy Barnes and Jane Mahoney)
Tokio Hotel, a German pop rock band, identical twin brothers Bill and Tom Kaulitz
Tompall & the Glaser Brothers, an American country music group, Tompall, Jim and Chuck Glaser
Tony! Toni! Toné!, an American soul/R&B group from Oakland, California, with brothers D'wayne Wiggins & Raphael Saadiq (born Charles Ray Wiggins)
Toto, an American rock band, brothers Steve, Jeff, and Mike Porcaro
The Trammps, an American disco and soul band, who were based in Philadelphia, whose members included brothers Stanley and Harold 'Doc' Wade 
Trapp Family, also known as the von Trapp Family and The Trapp Family Singers
Trapper Schoepp, an American folk rock band
Trina & Tamara, an American contemporary R&B group from Gary, Indiana composed of sisters Trina Powell and Tamara Powell
The Triplets, a pop rock trio composed of the triplets Diana, Sylvia, and Vicky Villegas
TRU, an American hip hop group with three brothers Master P, C-Murder, and Silkk the Shocker
Twinz, a hip hop duo from Long Beach, California, consisting of twin brothers Deon "Trip Locc" Williams and Dewayne "Wayniac" Williams
UB40, an English reggae band, Ali and Robin Campbell
Underground Sunshine, an American psychedelic rock band from Montello, Wisconsin, with brothers Berty & Frank Kohl
The Undertones, a British punk rock / new wave band, brothers John and Damian O'Neill
The Unthanks, an English folk group, with sisters Becky and Rachel Unthank
U.N.V., an R&B group based out of Detroit, Michigan, with brothers John & Shawn Powe, best known for their 1993 summer hit single, "Something's Goin' On"
The Valentinos, (also known as The Womack Brothers) was an American family R&B group from Cleveland, Ohio, best known for launching the careers of brothers Bobby Womack and Cecil Womack
Van Halen, an American heavy metal/hard rock band, Eddie, and Alex Van Halen
The Vaughan Brothers, blues rock duo from Texas, featuring guitarists and vocalists Jimmie & Stevie Ray Vaughan
The Velvelettes, an American singing girl group, signed to Motown in the 1960s, with sisters Mildred & Carolyn "Cal" Gill
Von Hertzen Brothers, a Finnish rock group, formed by three brothers
The Veronicas, an Australian electropop pop-rock duo, Jessica and Lisa Origliasso
The Verve Pipe, rock group from East Lansing, Michigan, with brothers Brad & Brian Vander Ark
Voice of the Beehive, an alternative pop rock band formed in London in 1986 by Californian sisters Tracey Bryn and Melissa Brooke Belland
Voices, an American R&B vocal girl group from Los Angeles that included sisters LaPetra & LaToya McMoore, and then-unknown twin sisters Tia and Tamera Mowry
The Voxpoppers, pop rock group from Brooklyn, New York, featuring brothers Freddie, Sal & Harry Tamburo, who made Top 20 in Billboard Hot 100 in 1958
Wadsworth Mansion, an early-1970s American rock band with brothers Steve & Mike Jablecki, best known for their 1970 Top 10 hit "Sweet Mary"
Rufus and Martha Wainwright
Wallace Brothers, R&B duo Ernest & Johnny Wallace, who made Billboard Hot 100 in 1964 with "Lover's Prayer"
The Warning, a Mexican rock trio, Daniela, Paulina and Alejandra Villarreal
The Watson Twins, American musical duo, identical twin sisters Chandra and Leigh Watson
The Webb Brothers are Christiaan, Justin, James and Cornelius Webb, all sons of the songwriter Jimmy Webb
Wet Willie, an American band from Mobile, Alabama, with brothers Jimmy & Jack Hall, best known for "Keep On Smilin'"
Whirlwind, R&B disco trio Sandie Ancrum and her brothers Charles & Eddie Ancrum, who made Billboard Hot 100 in 1976 with "Full Time Thing (Between Dusk and Dawn)" 
The Whispers, an American R&B group, founded by twin brothers Wallace and Walter Scott
Whitehead Bros., an American R&B duo from Philadelphia, Pennsylvania, made up of two brothers, Kenny Whitehead and John Whitehead Jr.
Wild Belle, an American band, composed of siblings Elliot and Natalie Bergman
The Wilkinsons, a Canadian country music trio, founded in 1997, that consisted of lead singer Amanda Wilkinson, her brother Tyler Wilkinson, and their father, Steve Wilkinson
The Williams Brothers, a singing quartet that performed extensively on radio, movies, nightclubs, and television from 1938 through the 1990s
Willie Max, a R&B trio composed of sisters Rose, Sky and Lyric Smith
The Wilson Family, an English folk music group, composed of six siblings
Wilson Phillips, an American pop group, sisters Wendy and Carnie Wilson
Johnny and Edgar Winter, American rock musicians who often performed and recorded together
The Wood Brothers, an American folk band consisting of brothers Chris & Oliver Wood, as well as multi-instrumentalist Jano Rix
The Woolies, an American rock band from Lansing, Michigan, with brothers Bob Baldori & Jeff Baldori, whose cover of "Who Do You Love?" became a regional hit when it was released as a single in 1966
Xscape, an American female R&B vocal quintet from Atlanta, Georgia, with sisters LaTocha & Tamika Scott
Young Guns, British rock band, brothers John and Fraser Taylor
YU grupa, a Serbian rock band, Dragi, Zika and Petar Jelic
Zapp, an American soul, funk, and P-Funk band whose nucleus was the Troutman brothers Roger, Larry, Lester, and Terry along with other relatives

Sibling groups in other mass media
The Coen Brothers, American screenwriters, directors and producers
The Farrelly Brothers, American screenwriters and directors
 The Kardashians, American reality television stars and socialites: Kourtney, Kim, Khloé and Rob. By virtue of appearing alongside their half-siblings on the reality television program Keeping Up with the Kardashians, Kendall and Kylie Jenner are sometimes included in this group, though they are the children of Kris Jenner and former spouse Caitlyn Jenner, not Robert Kardashian.
 The Marx Brothers, American comedy actors
 The McElroy brothers, known for their podcasts My Brother, My Brother and Me and The Adventure Zone, consisting of Justin McElroy, Travis McElroy, and Griffin McElroy
 The Olsen twins, American actresses Mary-Kate and Ashley
 The Polish brothers, American filmmakers
 The Scott Brothers, Canadian realtors Drew and Jonathan
 The Property Brothers, twin brothers Drew Scott and Jonathan Scott, stars of the Canadian reality television series.
 Brothers Quay, filmmaking twins
 Shaw Brothers, Hong Kong film production company by Runje, Runme, Runde, and Run Run Shaw 
 The Smothers Brothers, American comedians Tom and Dick
 Dylan and Cole Sprouse, American actors
 The Wachowskis, American screenwriters, directors and producers
 Warner Bros. was founded by the Warner brothers: Harry, Albert, Sam, and Jack
 The Wayans Brothers, African-American directors, screenwriters and actors

Siblings in crime
 Yigal Amir assassinated Israeli Prime Minister Yitzhak Rabin in conspiracy with his brother Hagai Amir and their friend Dror Adani
 Barker–Karpis Gang, consisted of, among others, Kate Barker's sons
 Dalton Gang, 5 of the 9 members were brothers
 The Kray Twins (Ronald and Reggie) - infamously known for their participation in organised crime during the 1950s and 1960s
 The Menendez Brothers, murdered both parents
 Pincheira brothers, an infamous Chilean royalist outlaw group in the early 19th century
 The Tsarnaev brothers, Dzhokhar and Tamerlan, perpetrator of Boston Marathon bombing
 Jasmiyah Kaneesha Whitehead and Tasmiyah Janeesha Whitehead, identical twins murdered their mother Nikki Whitehead
 Ned and Dan Kelly, the most famous Australian bushrangers. More books have been written about the Kelly Gang than any other subject in Australian history.

Other sibling groups
 The Dionne quintuplets, Canadian family, first quintuplets to survive to adulthood
 The Brothers Grimm, German folklorists and anthropologists
 The Koch brothers, American politicians and industrialists
 Hans and Sophie Scholl, German students and anti-Nazi activists executed in 1943
 The Lumière brothers, French photography manufacturers, filmmakers and cinématographe motion picture inventors.
 The Montgolfier Brothers, French inventors.
 Salazar brothers, notable group of Chilean siblings who became known for their slave raiding, corruption and role in unleashing the Mapuche uprising of 1655
 Sutter brothers, Canadian family who played or have been associated with the National Hockey League
 The Wright brothers, aviation pioneers and inventors
 OTMA, an acronym used by the daughters of Tsar Nicholas II of Russia
 The Polgár Sisters Susan, Sofia and Judit Polgar, each received a Chess Grandmaster title at an early age
The Kelly Family
Maserati Brothers
Wood Brothers
Green children of Woolpit

Fictional sibling groups

 The Baudelaire Orphans: Violet, Klaus, Sunny (A Series of Unfortunate Events)
 The Blues Brothers: Jake and Elwood
 The Brady Bunch: Greg Brady, Peter Brady, Bobby Brady, Marcia Brady, Jan Brady and Cindy Brady
The Carmichaels: Ashton, Ashley, Gax, Gianna, Lamar, Lily, Edgar, Sully, Sally, Elliot, and Suzy (Rugrats)
The Incredibles: Dash Parr, Violet Parr, Jack-Jack Parr
Hamada brothers - Hiro and Tadashi (Big Hero 6)
 Koopa Bros.: Green Ninjakoopa, Yellow Ninjakoopa, Black Ninjakoopa and Red Ninjakoopa (Paper Mario)
 Koopalings: Larry, Iggy, Roy, Morton, Lemmy, Wendy, and Ludwig (Super Mario Bros. 3)
Magic Tree House series: Annie and Jack
 Mario Bros.: Mario and Luigi (Super Mario Bros.)
The Mills Sisters: Regina and Zelena (Once Upon a Time)
Mobile Suit Gundam: Casval Rem Daikun and Artesia Som Deikun 
The Partridge Family: Keith, Laurie, Danny, Chris and Tracy, a television series about a musical family that ran from 1970 to 1974
 The Powerpuff Girls: Blossom, Bubbles and Buttercup
Scott brothers: Lucas and Nathan (One Tree Hill)
 The Simpsons: Bart, Lisa and Maggie
The Skywalkers: Luke and Leia
Takahashi brothers: Keisuke and Ryosuke (Initial D)
The Weasleys: Ron, Fred, George, and Ginny
 The Yo Dazzlers: Riffington, Big Bitz, Jean-Pierre, and Chip Dazzler (Yo Gabba Gabba)

See also
List of coupled siblings

References